Diocese of Kumanovo and Osogovo is a diocese of the Macedonian Orthodox Church in North Macedonia. It is headed by Metropolitan Josif.

Deaneries
Kumanovo-Kratovo Deanery
Kriva Palanka Deanery

List of Orthodox Churches

Kumanovo

Kriva Palanka

Kratovo

List of Orthodox Monasteries
Osogovo Monastery near Kriva Palanka 
Karpino Monastery near village Suvi Orah, Staro Nagorichane 
George the Trophy-bearer in Staro Nagorochane 
Psacha Monastery, village Psacha, Rankovce 
Matejche Monastery, village Matejche, Lipkovo

Picture gallery

See also

 List of Metropolitans of Diocese of Kumanovo and Osogovo

References

External links
Official website
Page of the former Diocese of Polog and Kumanovo

Kratovo Municipality
Kumanovo Municipality
Lipkovo Municipality
Macedonian Orthodox dioceses
Staro Nagoričane Municipality
Rankovce Municipality
Dioceses in North Macedonia